Husqvarna Motorcycles GmbH (marketed as Husqvarna) is a Swedish-origin Austrian company which designs, engineers, manufactures and distributes motocross, enduro, supermoto and street motorcycles.

The company began producing motorcycles in 1903 at Huskvarna, Sweden, as a subsidiary of the Husqvarna armament firm. Today, Husqvarna Motorcycles GmbH is owned by PIERER Mobility Group.

History

Prior to 1987 

Husqvarna was founded near the town of Huskvarna in Sweden in 1689. The company started out as a maker of muskets, and the Husqvarna logo still depicts a gun sight viewed from the end of the barrel.

As with many motorcycle manufacturers, Husqvarna first began producing bicycles in the late 19th century. In 1903, they made the jump to motorcycle manufacturing. The first "Husky" motorcycles used imported engines, and it was not until 1918 that Husqvarna began producing machines built entirely in-house. Around that time they secured a contract with the Swedish Army, and also began entering cross-country and long-distance motorcycle races. In 1920, Husqvarna established its own engine factory and the first engine to be designed was a 550 cc four-stroke 50-degree side-valve V-twin engine, similar to those made by companies like Harley-Davidson and Indian.

Husqvarna competed in Grand Prix road racing in the 350cc and 500cc classes during the 1930s and was Sweden's largest motorcycle manufacturer by 1939. All of the racing bikes were based on a 50-degree V-twin prototype built by Folke Mannerstedt in 1931. The company team beat the Norton works team at the Swedish GP in 1931 with a 1–2 finish by Ragnar Sundqvist and Gunnar Kalén. This and the next year's success led to a full commitment to the GP tracks with Stanley Woods and Ernie Nott joining the Husqvarna riding team. That year, Nott finished third in the 350cc Junior TT and Woods ran out of gas eight miles before the finish of the Senior TT. In 1935, the company withdrew racing support, but new bikes were still produced and raced privately, while the company focused on producing a new two-stroke, two-speed commuter bike.  That year, Woods won the Swedish GP (marking the fourth year in a row that a "Husky" had won) on a 500cc Husqvarna motorcycle that weighted .

With the rise of motocross as a sport Husqvarna focused on producing light weight racing bikes. They adapted their lightweight single cylinder bike to racing and delivered the Silverpilen, meaning 'silver arrow' in Swedish. At 75 kg and designed for racing it gained widespread popularity. Sporting many innovations like telescoping front forks and hydraulic damped suspension it became an international success.  The 1959 motocross championship went to Rolf Tibblin and his 250 cc Husqvarna. The 1960 world 500 cc motocross championship was won by Bill Nilsson on a four-stroke Husqvarna. In the 1960s, their lightweight, two-stroke-engined off-road bikes helped make the once-dominant British four-stroke motorcycles obsolete. Throughout the 1960s and 1970s, Husqvarna was a dominant force in the motocross world, winning 14 motocross world championships in the 125 cc, 250 cc and 500 cc divisions, 24 enduro world championships and 11 Baja 1000 victories.

1983 saw Husqvarna innovate again with the introduction of a 500 cc bike that set new standards for competition four-strokes. It was lightweight, air-cooled, easy-handling and changed the future of off-road racing motorcycles. It was the predecessor of the Husaberg brand.

Ownership changes and acquisition by KTM 
In 1987, the Husqvarna motorcycle division (not the other arms of the brand such as chainsaw production) was sold to Italian motorcycle manufacturer Cagiva, and years later became part of MV Agusta. A group of the company's managers and engineers were not willing to move to Italy and therefore founded Husaberg – which was acquired by KTM in 1995. Husqvarna motorcycles were then produced in Varese, Italy.

In July 2007, Husqvarna motorcycles was purchased by BMW Motorrad for a reported . BMW planned to continue operating Husqvarna Motorcycles as a separate enterprise. All development, sales and production activities, as well as the workforce, remained at the Varese location. BMW intended to position Husqvarna as "the two-wheeled version of what Mini is to the BMW's car division".

On 31 January 2013 BMW announced that Pierer Industrie has bought full stake in Husqvarna for an undisclosed amount. Pierer Industrie CEO, Stefan Pierer was also the CEO of Cross Industries, then the main shareholder of KTM-Sportmotorcycle parent KTM, and the CEO of KTM. Later in 2013, direct ownership of the Husqvarna company was transferred and license rights were sold from Pierer Industrie to KTM, making the newly established Husqvarna Motorcycle GmbH part of the KTM Group. Husqvarna motorcycle production at Mattighofen in Austria started on 7 October 2013. At the same time, Husqvarna spin-off Husaberg was re-united with Husqvarna, terminating the existence of the Husaberg brand.

Recent developments 

Recently, Husqvarna Motorcycles has been preparing its re-entry into the street motorcycle market. In 2014, the company presented prototypes of the newly developed 401 Vitpilen and 401 Svartpilen at the EICMA in Milan, Italy. Production ready versions were shown in 2016. Together with the 701 Vitpilen, which was first revealed in 2015, these motorcycles became publicly available in 2018.

In 2017, Husqvarna Motorcycles introduced a new range of enduro motorcycles with a self-developed  two-stroke fuel injection system (Transfer Port Injection - TPI). The new fuel efficient, sensor-controlled technology conforms with the Euro 4 regulations for emission management.

Timeline of ownership 

 1903 – Subsidiary of Husqvarna Armament
 1978 – Electrolux acquired Husqvarna.
 1987 – Motorcycle division sold to Cagiva
 1988 – Husaberg Motor AB brand spinoff
 2007 – Husqvarna motorcycles purchased by BMW
 2013 – Husqvarna AG purchased by Pierer Industrie
 2013 – Transfer to KTM AG, establishing Husqvarna Motorcycle GmbH and reuniting with Husaberg

Current models

Model naming conventions 
Husqvarna names many of their motorcycles according to a nomenclature of engine cycle ("F" for Four-stroke, "T" for Two-stroke), application or type ("C" for motoCross machines, "E" for Enduro motorcycles, "X" for Xcountry machines, "S" for Supermotos), and engine displacement. Some models of two-stroke machines formally had the suffix "i" included to indicate that these models have transfer port injection, rather than carburetors, but Husqvarna has since changed nearly all large-displacement two-stroke models to fuel injection. For example:

 FS 450 - a four-stroke supermoto with 450 cc engine displacement
 TE 300i - a two-stroke enduro motorcycle with 300 cc engine displacement and transfer port injection
 TC 125 - a two-stroke motocross machine with 125 cc engine displacement and carburetor

Some newer models (particularly of larger displacement) include a numbered designation of _01. These designations are not direct references to the engine displacement, but approximate values. For example:

 401 designates a 373 cc engine, derived from the KTM 390 series of street bikes
 501 designates a 510 cc engine, derived from the KTM 500 series of enduro bikes
 701 designates a 690 cc engine, derived from the KTM 690 series of enduro, supermoto, and street bikes

Husqvarna also use the names "Vitpilen" and "Svartpilen" for their range of naked street bikes, which are Swedish for "white arrow" and "black arrow", respectively.

Racing
Husqvarna has been a regular and successful presence at international off-road racing events since the 1930s. By 2008, riders on Husqvarna machines had secured more than 70 Motocross, Enduro and Supermoto world titles as well as numerous victories at important rally races like the Baja 1000.

Since 2015, the energy drink manufacturer Rockstar is the title sponsor of Husqvarna's off-road factory team. The Rockstar Energy Husqvarna Factory Racing Team competes in all off-road classes, participating in every event of the AMA Supercross and Motocross series. So far, it has scored titles in the 2016 FIM Cross-Country Rallies World Championship, the 2015/2016 FIM SuperEnduro World Championship and in the 2016 AMA EnduroCross Championship.

Exemplary Championships

Motocross

 1959 – Rolf Tibblin, European Motocross Champion, 250 cc class.
 1960 – Bill Nilsson, Motocross World Champion, 500 cc class.
 1962 – Rolf Tibblin, Motocross World Champion, 500 cc class.
 1962 – Torsten Hallman, Motocross World Champion, 250 cc class.
 1963 – Rolf Tibblin, Motocross World Champion, 500 cc class.
 1963 – Torsten Hallman, Motocross World Champion, 250 cc class.
 1966 – Torsten Hallman, Motocross World Champion, 250 cc class.
 1967 – Torsten Hallman, Motocross World Champion, 250 cc class.
 1969 – Bengt Åberg, Motocross World Champion, 500 cc class.
 1970 – Bengt Åberg, Motocross World Champion, 500 cc class.
 1974 – Heikki Mikkola, Motocross World Champion, 500 cc class.
 1976 – Heikki Mikkola, Motocross World Champion, 250 cc class.
 1979 – Håkan Carlqvist, Motocross World Champion, 250 cc class.
 1993 – Jacky Martens, Motocross World Champion, 500 cc class.
 1998 – Alessio Chiodi, Motocross World Champion, 125 cc class
 1999 – Alessio Chiodi, Motocross World Champion, 125 cc class
 2014 – Ben Adriaenssen & Ben van den Bogaart, Sidecarcross World Championship
 2014 – Tony Saunders, UK GT Cup, Youth Lites Class.
 2014 – Nathan Watson, UK Mx National, MX1 Class.
 2016 – Jan Hendrickx & Ben van den Bogaart, Sidecarcross World Championship
 2017 – Zach Osborne, Lucas Oil AMA Pro Motocross Championship, 250 cc class.
 2020 - Zach Osborne, Lucas Oil AMA Pro Motocross Champion 450cc class.

Supercross

 2017 – Zach Osborne, Monster Energy AMA Supercross Championship, East Coast 250 cc class.
 2018 – Jason Anderson, Monster Energy AMA Supercross Championship, 450 cc class.
 2018 – Zach Osborne, Monster Energy AMA Supercross Championship, East Coast 250 cc class.

Baja 1000

 1967 – J.N. Roberts, Malcolm Smith
 1969 – Gunnar Nilsson, J.N. Roberts
 1971 – Malcolm Smith, Gunnar Nilsson
 1972 – Gunnar Nilsson, Rolf Tibblin
 1973 – Mitch Mayes, A.C. Bakken
 1976 – Larry Roeseler, Mitch Mayes
 1977 – Brent Wallingsford, Scot Harden
 1978 – Larry Roeseler, Jack Johnson
 1979 – Larry Roeseler, Jack Johnson
 1981 – Scot Harden, Brent Wallingsford
 1983 – Dan Smith, Dan Ashcraft

Enduro

 1990 – 350 cc World Enduro Championship
 1991 – 250 cc World Enduro Championship
 1992 – 350 cc World Enduro Championship
 1993 – 125 cc World Enduro Championship
 1993 – 350 cc World Enduro Championship
 1994 – 125 cc World Enduro Championship
 1994 – 500 cc World Enduro Championship
 1995 – 125 cc World Enduro Championship
 1995 – 500 cc World Enduro Championship
 1996 – 350 cc World Enduro Championship
 1998 – 500 cc World Enduro Championship
 1999 – 500 cc World Enduro Championship
 2000 – 250 cc World Enduro Championship
 2001 – 125 cc World Enduro Championship
 2001 – 400 cc World Enduro Championship
 2001 – 500 cc World Enduro Championship
 2002 – 125 cc World Enduro Championship
 2002 – 250 cc World Enduro Championship
 2002 – 500 cc World Enduro Championship
 2003 – 400 cc World Enduro Championship
 2010 – E1 World Enduro Championship with Antoine Méo
 2011 – E1 World Enduro Championship with Juha Salminen
 2011 – E2 World Enduro Championship with Antoine Méo
 2014 – E2 World Enduro Championship with Pela Renet
 2015 – E3 World Enduro Championship with Mathias Bellino

SuperEnduro

 2015/16 FIM SuperEnduro World Championship with Colton Haaker
 2016/17 FIM SuperEnduro World Championship with Colton Haaker
 2018/19 FIM SuperEnduro World Championship with Colton Haaker
 2019/20 FIM SuperEnduro World Championship with Billy Bolt
 2021/22 FIM SuperEnduro World Championship with Billy Bolt
 2022/23 FIM SuperEnduro World Championship with Billy Bolt

Hard Enduro

 2021 FIM Hard Enduro World Championship with Billy Bolt

Supermoto

 2005 – Gérald Delepine, SM1 World Supermoto Championship
 2007 – Adrien Chareyre, SM1 World Supermoto Championship
 2007 – Gérald Delepine, SM2 World Supermoto Championship
 2008 – Adrien Chareyre, SM2 World Supermoto Championship
 2009 – Adrien Chareyre, SM2 World Supermoto Championship

Grand Prix

Moto2
Starting from the 2023 season, Husqvarna is the sponsor working with the Intact GP team in the Moto2 world championship and uses the name Liqui Moly Husqvarna Intact GP..

Moto3
After being acquired by KTM in 2013, Husqvarna entered the Moto3 World Championship in 2014 and 2015 as a unique constructor using their KTM-based FR250GP. The team re-entered Moto3 beginning with the 2020 season.

Other Ventures

Automobile manufacturing 

Toward the end of World War II, a team comprising Bengt Magnusson (head of R&D), Stig Tham (engineer), Calle Heimdal (engine designer) and Birger Johansson investigated manufacture of a small, simple, inexpensive car. The design looked similar to the Saab 92, but with three wheels (two front, one back), and an unusual split rear window. According to some sources, the similarities with the Saab 92 may have had something to do with Sixten Sason working as designer at Husqvarna. A prototype was built in 1943, powered by a  two-cylinder 500 cc DKW motorcycle engine with chain drive to the rear wheel. The wheels came from a Fiat 500. The project was cancelled in 1944, and the prototype was scrapped at the end of the 1950s.

Bicycle manufacturing 

Husqvarna is also prominent in Swedish bicycle history. They have been one of the Swedish military bicycle manufacturers. Husqvarna's Novo hub competed well with imports, but bicycle manufacturing was discontinued in the early 1960s.

Notes

References

External links
 Husqvarna Accessories India
 Husqvarna Motorcycles

Motorcycle manufacturers of Austria
Swedish companies established in 1903
Vehicle manufacturing companies established in 1903
Swedish brands
Austrian brands
Motorcycle manufacturers of Sweden
2013 mergers and acquisitions
Bajaj Group